There is a list of neighborhoods that reside in the Sections of Missoula, Montana. Note: The section names are in Bold and the zones that reside in a neighborhood are in italic.

Downtown Missoula
North Downtown
 Railroad Core
 Redevelopment zone
West Downtown
 St. Patrick Hospital
 Missoula County courthouse
 Old U.S highway 93
 Caras Park/ Downtown core
 Historic zone-Wilma Building
South Downtown
 new development zone
 Historic zone
East Downtown
 Missoula Public Library
 Historic Zone- Missoula U.S Post office
East Missoula
Suburban
Canyon River Golf Course
Mount Jumbo Elementary District
Hope Baptist Church
Fort Missoula
Southgate Mall District
Spartan Park
Jefferson Fine arts building
Missoula County Fairgrounds
Playfair Park
Splash Montana
Trempers Shopping Center
Miller Creek/Linda Vista
Rural
Linda Vista Golf Course
Maloney Ranch
South Hills (Montana)
Rural
Moose can Gully Park
Garland Park
Skyview Park
Schools
Mullan Road
Pleasant View Housing
 Hellate Elementary School District
Retired Living assistance
Costco/Sears shopping district
Missoula International Airport
Desmet School District
Canyon Creek Neighborhood
Wingate/Hawthorne Hotel
Orchard Homes, Montana
Big Sky High School District
Spurgin Park
Hawthorne School
Mountain View School
Target Range School District
Coomuntiy Medical Center (Montana)
McCauley Butte
Rattlesnake
Suburban
Greenough Park
Gregory Park
Pineview Park
Hamilton Park
Schools
Rattlesnake Elementary
Riverfront
Suburban
Ogren Park at Allegiance Field
Parks
McCormick Park
Clark Fork Natural Park
University of Montana
Historical District
University of Montana
Mount Sentinel
University Golf Course
Schools
 Hellgate High School
Paxson Elementary
Parks
Jacob's Island
John Toole Park
Bonner Park
Madison Park

References 
http://neighborhoodsofmissoula.com/mullan-road/
http://neighborhoodsofmissoula.com/downtown/
http://neighborhoodsofmissoula.com/east-missoula/
http://neighborhoodsofmissoula.com/franklin-to-the-fort/
http://neighborhoodsofmissoula.com/lewisclark-southgate/
http://neighborhoodsofmissoula.com/south-hills/
http://neighborhoodsofmissoula.com/university-area/
http://neighborhoodsofmissoula.com/riverfront/
http://neighborhoodsofmissoula.com/rattlesnake/

Populated places in Missoula County, Montana